This article is a list of historic places in St. John County, New Brunswick entered on the Canadian Register of Historic Places, whether they are federal, provincial, or municipal. While the vast majority of listings are within the city of Saint John, there are a few in outlying rural portions of the county.

List of historic places

See also
 List of historic places in New Brunswick
 List of National Historic Sites of Canada in New Brunswick

Saint John County, New Brunswick